NneNne Iwuji-Eme  is a British diplomat. In March 2018, she was appointed to be the High Commissioner of the United Kingdom to Mozambique and took up her post in July 2018 in succession to Joanna Kuenssberg. She is the first black woman to represent the United Kingdom as a high commissioner.

Early life and career 
Iwuji-Eme, who is of Igbo Nigerian heritage, was born in Truro, Cornwall, England, to parents who worked for the United Nations. She was educated at St Felix School, a boarding school in Southwold, Suffolk, from 1990 to 1995. She studied economics at the University of Manchester, and has one son.

Iwuji-Eme joined the Department for the Environment, Food and Rural Affairs (Defra) in 1999 as an economic advisor. In 2002, she moved to the Foreign and Commonwealth Office (FCO) as Head of Africa, Middle East and Transition Economies in its Economic Policy Department. Prior to her appointment to her current post as High Commissioner of the United Kingdom to Mozambique she was the UK's First Secretary in Brazil.

References

External links

 
Twitter page

Living people
Alumni of the University of Manchester
Black British people
British civil servants
British women ambassadors
English people of Nigerian descent
High Commissioners of the United Kingdom to Mozambique
Members of HM Diplomatic Service
People from Truro
Year of birth missing (living people)
English people of Igbo descent
Igbo diplomats
21st-century British diplomats